The Lionel Wendt Art Centre is a major art centre and theatre in Colombo, Sri Lanka, dedicated to the memory of Sri Lankan photographic artist Lionel Wendt. It combines live theatre and art exhibition, with two exhibition galleries and a theatre with over 600 seats.
It is managed by a trust established by an Act of Parliament.

History
Early art exhibitions were held at Wendt's home, with the second and third taking place after Lionel Wendt's death in 1944. After his death, his brother Harry decided to open a centre in his brother's memory, but he died just a year after his brother. The construction of the centre was finished by their mutual friend, Harold Peiris, for whom one of the Centre's second galleries is named.

The theatre portion of the centre opened on 12 December 1953, with the production of Maxim Gorky's "The Lower Depths", starring  Iranganie Serasinghe and produced by E. F. C. Ludowyk. Performances in subsequent years included Ediriweera Sarachchandra's "Maname" (1956) and Chitrasena's "Karadiya" (1961).

Board of trustees 
 Original
Harold Peiris (sole life-trustee)
Stanley de Saram
Trevor de Saram
James Naidoo
Dr. Paul E. Pieris
B. G. Thornley
L. C. van Geyzel

See also
Nelung Arts Centre
Theatre of Sri Lanka
Nelum Pokuna Performing Arts Theatre
National Art Gallery, Sri Lanka

References

External links
lionelwendt.org
Aesthetic citadel of Ceylonese art

Theatres in Colombo District
Cultural buildings in Colombo
Tourist attractions in Colombo